The Church of St Nikola is located in Dobrelja village, in Bosnia and Herzegovina, municipality of Gacko, Republic of Srpska entity. The church was rebuilt between 1884 and 1889. The temple was consecrated in 2001.

National monument
The Church of St Nikola was declared a National Monument of Bosnia and Herzegovina, and declared by Commission to preserve national monuments of Bosnia and Herzegovina on 14 June 2000.

Gallery

References

Buildings and structures in Republika Srpska
Serbian Orthodox church buildings in Bosnia and Herzegovina
Gacko
National Monuments of Bosnia and Herzegovina
19th-century Serbian Orthodox church buildings